Anna of Austria (7 July 1528 – 16 October 1590), a member of the Imperial House of Habsburg, was Duchess of Bavaria from 1550 until 1579, by her marriage with Duke Albert V.

Family 
Born at the Bohemian court in Prague, Anna was the third of fifteen children of King Ferdinand I (1503–1564) from his marriage with the Jagiellonian princess Anna of Bohemia and Hungary (1503–1547). Her siblings included: Elizabeth, Queen of Poland, Maximilian II, Holy Roman Emperor, Ferdinand II, Archduke of Austria, Catherine, Queen of Poland, Eleanor, Duchess of Mantua, Barbara, Duchess of Ferrara, Charles II, Archduke of Austria and Johanna, Duchess of Tuscany.

Anna's paternal grandparents were King Philip I of Castile and his wife Queen Joanna I. Her maternal grandparents were King Vladislaus II of Bohemia and Hungary and his third wife Anne of Foix-Candale.

Life 
Young Anna was engaged several times as a child, first to Prince Theodor of Bavaria (1526–1534), the eldest son of Duke William IV, then to Charles d'Orléans (1522–1545). However, both died at a young age. 

Anna finally married on 4 July 1546 in Regensburg at the age of 17, Prince Albert V, the younger brother of her first fiancé. The wedding gift was 50,000 Guilder. This marriage was part of a web of alliances in which her uncle Emperor Charles V hoped to secure Duke William's support before embarking on the Schmalkaldic Wars. Indeed, Duke William, though he remained formally neutral, granted the passage of Imperial troops to march against the forces of the Schmalkaldic League which besieged the Ingolstadt fortress.

After their marriage, the young couple lived at the Trausnitz Castle in Landshut, until Albert became duke upon his father's death on 7 March 1550. At the Munich Residenz, Anna and Albert had great influence on the spiritual life in the Duchy of Bavaria, and enhanced the reputation of Munich as a city of art, by founding several museums and laying the foundations for the Bavarian State Library.

Anna and Albert were also patrons to the painter Hans Muelich and the Franco-Flemish composer Orlande de Lassus. In 1552, the duke commissioned an inventory of the jewelry in the couple's possession. The resulting manuscript, still held by the Bavarian State Library, was the Jewel Book of the Duchess Anna of Bavaria ("Kleinodienbuch der Herzogin Anna von Bayern"), and contains 110 drawings by Hans Muelich.

A religious woman, Anna made extensive donations to the Catholic abbey of Vadstena in Sweden and generously supported the Franciscan Order. She also provided a strict education of her grandson, the later Elector Maximilian I of Bavaria.

When her husband died on 24 October 1579 and was succeeded by his eldest surviving son, William V, Anna as duchess dowager maintained her own court at the Munich Residenz. 150 years after her death in 1590, her descendant Elector Charles I of Bavaria used her marriage treaty with Albert as a pretext to claim the Austrian and Bohemian crown lands of the Habsburg monarchy.

Children 
The marriage of Anna and Albert produced the following children:
 Karl (7 September 1547 – 7 December 1547)
 William V (29 September 1548 – 7 February 1626)
 Ferdinand (20 January 1550 – 30 January 1608)
 Maria Anna (21 March 1551 – 29 April 1608) married Archduke Charles II of Austria
 Maximiliana Maria (4 July 1552 – 11 July 1614), died unmarried.
 Friedrich (26 July 1553 – 18 April 1554)
 Ernst (17 December 1554 – 17 February 1612), Archbishop of Cologne

Ancestors

References 

|-

16th-century House of Habsburg
16th-century Austrian women
House of Wittelsbach
Duchesses of Bavaria
Nobility from Prague
1528 births
1590 deaths
Austrian princesses
Daughters of emperors
Burials at Munich Frauenkirche
Children of Ferdinand I, Holy Roman Emperor
Daughters of kings